Brian Thomas Johnston (born May 2, 1986) is a former American football linebacker. He was drafted by the Kansas City Chiefs in the seventh round of the 2008 NFL Draft. He played college football at Gardner–Webb.

Early years 
Johnston was a defensive end at Madison High School in San Diego, California, where he was a two-time First-team All-Harbor League selection (as a junior and senior). He totaled 82 tackles (30 solo), 10 sacks, 13 tackles for loss, four forced fumbles and six passes defensed as a senior.

College career 
For his career (2004–2007) Johnston played in 42 games and started 40 at Gardner–Webb. His career totals were 268 tackles (124 solo), 21 sacks and 55.5 tackles for loss, ten forced fumbles, three fumble recoveries, six passes defensed, and one blocked kick. He also caught a three-yard TD pass on offense, as well. 
As a senior in 2007 he started all 11 games at left defensive end, and had 74 tackles (34 solo), 24 tackles for loss, 6 sacks, a forced fumble, three passes defensed and a three-yard TD catch on offense. He earned numerous college division First-team All-America selections and was named First-team All-Big South Conference for the third consecutive season and was the Defensive Most Valuable Player for the second straight season as well. He also was a finalist for the Buck Buchanan Award in 2007. In 2006, he started 11 contests at left defensive end, totaling 77 tackles (35 solo), 14 tackles for loss, 8 sacks, two forced fumbles and one fumble recovery and was Second-team All-America honors by The NFL Draft Report, Associated Press and Football Gazette and was named the conference's Defensive Player of the Year and a First-team All-Big South Conference selection. In 2005, he started all 11 games in his first season at right defensive end, totaling 59 tackles (28 solo) with 5 sacks and 12.5 tackles for loss, four forced fumbles, one fumble recovery, one pass defensed and a blocked kick and was also named First-team All-Big Conference for the first time. Johnston played in nine games as a true freshman making seven starts at outside linebacker and making 58 tackles (24 solo), 2.sacks, 5 tackles for loss, three forced fumbles, one fumble recovery, and two passes defensed.

Professional career

Pre-draft

Kansas City Chiefs
He became the first player the Chiefs took from Gardner–Webb when they selected him with the first of their two seventh-round picks (210th overall) in 2008. In 2008, he played 9 games and made 3 tackles. He was waived by the Chiefs on May 26, 2009.

Johnston was claimed by the Detroit Lions off of waivers on May 28, but failed his physical and was not added to the team's roster.

Miami Dolphins
After spending the 2009 season out of football, Johnston signed a future contract with the Miami Dolphins on January 6, 2010.

UFL
Johnston was drafted by the Omaha Nighthawks in the eighth round of the 2011 UFL draft.

References

External links
Gardner-Webb Runnin' Bulldogs bio
Kansas City Chiefs bio
Miami Dolphins bio 

1986 births
Living people
Players of American football from San Diego
American football defensive ends
American football linebackers
Gardner–Webb Runnin' Bulldogs football players
Kansas City Chiefs players
Miami Dolphins players
San Jose SaberCats players
New Orleans VooDoo players